This is the discography of Chinese singer-songwriter Jane Zhang. Zhang has released seven studio albums, two compilation albums, two live albums and 3 EPs.

Albums

Studio albums

EPs

Compilation albums

Live albums

Other songs

Collaborations
 "Another Heaven" / 另一個天堂 (with Leehom Wang) from his 13th studio album Heart Beat

References

Discographies of Chinese artists
Mandopop discographies
Discography